Jennifer Susan "Jenny" Lay (née Pescot; 1937 – 14 July 2013) was a British local politician in Norwich. She was Lord Mayor of Norwich for 2011–12.

Lay was born in Worthing, Sussex. Growing up in Portsmouth, England, she trained as a nurse. After marrying her husband, Kenneth Lay, in the 1960s, they had to move around the country, due to his job as a prison officer. In 1980, they arrived in Norwich, loved the area, and decided to never leave. She soon became a member of its city council representing the Labour Party and, in 1998, its Sheriff. In 2009, she was diagnosed with breast cancer and had to undergo a double mastectomy. In 2011, she was appointed Lord Mayor of Norwich. In late 2012, the cancer returned and, her health failing, she was forced to step down from the mayorship and city council.

Lay died of cancer on 14 July 2013 at the age of 74. She is survived by her husband, her son, Steve and daughter, Sue.

References

External links
Norwich Mayors, Lord Mayors and Sheriffs from 1900 to present day

Date of birth missing
1937 births
2013 deaths
Women councillors in England
Labour Party (UK) councillors
Mayors of Norwich
Sheriffs of Norwich
Deaths from cancer in England
Women mayors of places in England